The Battle of Carthage State Historic Site is a state-owned property located in the city of Carthage, Missouri. The  site preserves one of the skirmish sites of the Battle of Carthage which took place in 1861 as one of the first battles of the American Civil War. The site was acquired by the state in 1990 and is managed by the Missouri Department of Natural Resources.

References

External links
Battle of Carthage State Historic Site Missouri Department of Natural Resources

1990 establishments in Missouri
Missouri State Historic Sites
Protected areas established in 1990
Protected areas of Jasper County, Missouri